Hakea vittata, commonly known as the striped hakea, hooked needlewood, is a shrub of the family Proteaceae. Restricted to an area on the  Eyre Peninsula and the Gawler Range in South Australia and small areas in eastern Victoria.

Description
Hakea vittata is a  prostrate or straggly shrub typically growing to a height of  that forms a lignotuber. White smooth branchlets are covered with short soft hairs. An inflorescence of 8-14 reddish-white flowers appear in leaf axils. Hakea vittata has two characteristics that distinguish it from other species in the genus, the presence of "witches broom" galls where it has a mass of dense shoots growing from a single point. Secondly the fruit splitting past the seed tip only on the side of the red-brown wood zone. Flowering occurs from August to November.

Taxonomy and naming
Hakea vittata  was first formally described by the botanist Robert Brown as part of the work On the natural order of plants called Proteaceae as published in the Transactions of the Linnean Society of London. The specific epithet   (vittatus) is a Latin word for longitudinally-striped, referring to the markings on the fruit.

The only synonym is Hakea vittata var. vittata.

Distribution and habitat
Hooked needle-wood is found in the southern regions of South Australia from Kangaroo Island and Fleurieu Peninsula growing mostly in sandy mallee scrub on limestone.

References

vittata
Flora of South Australia
Flora of Victoria (Australia)
Taxa named by Robert Brown (botanist, born 1773)